七星 may refer to:
Qixing (disambiguation), multiple topics
Lotte Chilsung, a drink manufacturer in South Korea

See also
Seven star (disambiguation)